The New York City Subway is a rapid transit system that serves four of the five boroughs of New York City, New York: the Bronx, Brooklyn, Manhattan, and Queens. Its operator is the New York City Transit Authority (NYCTA), which is controlled by the Metropolitan Transportation Authority (MTA) of New York. In 2016, an average of 5.66 million passengers used the system daily, making it the busiest rapid transit system in the United States and the seventh busiest in the world.

The first underground line opened on October 27, 1904, almost 35 years after the opening of the first elevated line in New York City, the West Side and Yonkers Patent Railway, which became the IRT Ninth Avenue Line. By the time the first subway opened, the lines had been consolidated into two privately owned systems, the Brooklyn Rapid Transit Company (BRT, later Brooklyn–Manhattan Transit Corporation, BMT) and the Interborough Rapid Transit Company (IRT).  After 1913, all lines built for the IRT and most lines for the BRT were built by the city and leased to the companies.  The first line of the city-owned and operated Independent Subway System (IND) opened in 1932; this system was intended to compete with the private systems and allow some of the elevated railways to be torn down.  However, it was kept within the core of the city because of the low amount of startup capital provided to the municipal Board of Transportation by the state. This required it to be run "at cost", necessitating fares up to double the five-cent fare popular at the time.

In 1940, the city took over running the previously privately operated systems.  Some elevated lines closed immediately while others closed soon after. Integration was slow, but several connections were built between the IND and BMT, which now operate as one division called the B Division.  Since IRT infrastructure is too small for B Division cars, the IRT remains its own division, the A Division.

The NYCTA, a public authority presided over by New York City, was created in 1953 to take over subway, bus, and streetcar operations from the city. The NYCTA was under control of the state-level MTA in 1968. Soon after the MTA took control of the subway, New York City entered a fiscal crisis. It closed many elevated subway lines that became too expensive to maintain. Graffiti and crime became common, and equipment and stations fell into decrepit condition. The New York City Subway tried to stay solvent, so it had to make many service cutbacks and defer necessary maintenance projects. In the 1980s an $18 billion financing program for the rehabilitation of the subway began.

The September 11 attacks resulted in service disruptions, particularly on the IRT Broadway–Seventh Avenue Line, which ran directly underneath the World Trade Center.  Sections of the tunnel, as well as the Cortlandt Street station, which was directly underneath the Twin Towers, were severely damaged and had to be rebuilt, requiring suspension of service on that line south of Chambers Street.  Ten other nearby stations were temporarily closed.  By March 2002, seven of those stations had reopened. The rest (except for Cortlandt Street on the IRT Broadway–Seventh Avenue Line) reopened on September 15, 2002, along with service south of Chambers Street.

Since the 2000s, expansions include the 7 Subway Extension that opened in September 2015, and the Second Avenue Subway, the first phase of which opened on January 1, 2017. However, at the same time, under-investment in the subway system led to a transit crisis that peaked in 2017.

Precursors

Steam railways

Even though there was an earlier, underground railroad called the Atlantic Avenue Tunnel since 1844, it had no underground subway stops. Construction of this tunnel, which was built mainly to create a grade-separated right of way for the Brooklyn and Jamaica Railroad (now the Long Island Rail Road's Atlantic Branch), began in May 1844, and the tunnel was open by December 1844. This led to South Ferry at the foot of Atlantic Avenue, where passengers could catch ferries to Manhattan. This extension, running under Cobble Hill, was closed by 1861. The tunnel was reopened for tourism in 1982, and closed again in 2010.

The beginnings of the actual Subway came from various excursion railroads to Coney Island and elevated railroads in Manhattan and Brooklyn. At that time, New York County (Manhattan Island and part of the Bronx), Kings County (including the cities of Brooklyn and Williamsburg), and Queens County were separate municipal entities. Competing steam-powered elevated railroads were built over major avenues. The first elevated line was constructed from 1867 to 1870 by Charles Harvey and his West Side and Yonkers Patent Railway company along Greenwich Street and Ninth Avenue (although cable cars were the initial mode of transportation on that railway). More lines were built on Second, Third and Sixth Avenues. None of these structures remain today, but these lines later shared trackage with subway trains as part of the IRT system.

In Kings County, elevated railroads were built by several companies over Lexington, Myrtle, Third and Fifth Avenues, Fulton Street and Broadway. These also later shared trackage with subway trains operated by the BRT and BMT. Most of these structures have been dismantled, but some have been rebuilt and upgraded. These lines were linked to Manhattan by various ferries and later the tracks along the Brooklyn Bridge (which originally had their own line and were later integrated into the BRT/BMT). Also in Kings County, six steam excursion railroads were built to various beaches in the southern part of the county; all but one (the Manhattan Beach Line) eventually fell under BMT control.

Beach Pneumatic Transit

The Beach Pneumatic Transit was the first attempt to build an underground public transit system in New York City. In 1869, Alfred Ely Beach and his Beach Pneumatic Transit Company of New York began constructing a pneumatic subway line beneath Broadway. Funneled through a company he set up, Beach put up $350,000 of his own money to bankroll the project.

It remained little more than a curiosity, running only a single car on its one-block-long track to a dead-end at its terminus. Passengers would simply ride out and back, to see what the proposed subway might be like. During its first two weeks of operation, the Beach Pneumatic Transit sold over 11,000 rides, with 400,000 rides provided during its first year of operation. Although the public showed initial approval, Beach was delayed in getting permission to expand it. By the time he finally gained permission in 1873, public and financial support had waned, and the subway was closed down.

The final blow to the project was a stock market crash in 1873 which caused investors to withdraw support. After the project was shut down, the tunnel entrance was sealed, and the station, built in part of the basement of the Rogers Peet Building, was reclaimed for other uses. The entire building was lost to fire in 1898. In 1912, workers excavating for the present-day BMT Broadway Line dug into the old Beach tunnel; today, no part of this line remains as the tunnel was completely within the limits of the present day City Hall Station under Broadway.

Beginnings and rapid expansion

The first subways

IRT

In 1898, New York, Kings and Richmond Counties, and parts of Queens and Westchester Counties and their constituent cities, towns, villages, and hamlets, were consolidated into the City of Greater New York. During this era the expanded City of New York resolved that it wanted the core of future rapid transit to be underground subways but realized that no private company was willing to put up the enormous capital required to build beneath the streets.

Planning for the system began with the Rapid Transit Act, authorized by the New York State Legislature on May 22, 1894, which created the Board of Rapid Transit Railroad Commissioners. The act provided that the commission would lay out routes with the consent of property owners and local authorities, either build the system or sell a franchise for its construction, and lease the operation to a private firm. A line through Lafayette Street (then Elm Street) to Union Square was considered, but at first a more costly route under lower Broadway was adopted. A legal battle with property owners along the route led to the courts denying permission to build through Broadway in 1896.

The Elm Street route was chosen later that year, cutting west to Broadway via 42nd Street. This new plan, formally adopted on January 14, 1897, consisted of a line from City Hall north to Kingsbridge and a branch under Lenox Avenue and to Bronx Park, to have four tracks from City Hall to the junction at 103rd Street. The "awkward alignment...along Forty-Second Street", as the commission put it, was necessitated by objections to using Broadway south of 34th Street. Legal challenges were resolved in 1899.

The city decided to issue rapid transit bonds outside of its regular bonded debt limit and build the subways itself; it contracted with the Interborough Rapid Transit Company (which by that time ran the elevated lines in Manhattan) to equip and operate the subways, sharing the profits with the city and guaranteeing a fixed five-cent fare.

BRT

Starting in 1899, the Brooklyn Rapid Transit Company (BRT; 1896–1923) and Brooklyn–Manhattan Transit Corporation (BMT; 1923–1940) operated rapid transit lines in New York City — at first only elevated railways and later also subways.

The BRT was incorporated on January 18, 1896. It took over the bankrupt Long Island Traction Company in early February, acquiring the Brooklyn Heights Railroad and the lessee of the Brooklyn City Rail Road. It then acquired the Brooklyn, Queens County and Suburban Railroad. The BRT took over the property of a number of surface railroads, the earliest of which, the Brooklyn, Bath and Coney Island Railroad or West End Line, opened for passenger service on October 9, 1863, between Fifth Avenue at 36th Street at the border of Brooklyn City and Bath Beach in the Town of Gravesend, New York. A short piece of surface route of this railroad, the BMT West End Line (today's ) on the west side of the Coney Island Complex north of the Coney Island Creek, is the oldest existing piece of rapid transit right-of-way in New York City and in the U.S., having opened on June 8, 1864.

On January 30, 1899, the Brooklyn Union Elevated Railroad was incorporated; it acquired the property of the bankrupt Brooklyn Elevated Railroad on February 17. The BRT gained control a month later, on March 25, and leased the elevated company to the Brooklyn Heights Railroad, which was until then solely a street railway company. The other elevated company in Brooklyn, the Kings County Elevated Railway, was sold under foreclosure to the BRT on July 6, 1899. Initially the surface and elevated railroad lines ran on steam power, but between 1893 and 1900 the lines were converted to run on electricity. An exception was the service on the Brooklyn Bridge. Trains were operated by cables from 1883 to 1896, when they were converted to electric power.

By 1900, The BRT had acquired virtually all of the rapid transit and streetcar operations in its target area. Only the Coney Island and Brooklyn Railroad and the short Van Brunt Street and Erie Basin Railroad remained independent; the former was acquired in 1913 or 1914. The incorporated lines were:
 Sea Beach Railway, acquired in November 1897 and leased to the BHRR
 Sea View Railroad (Coney Island Elevated), acquired in November 1897 and leased to the BHRR
 Nassau Electric Railroad (lessee of the Atlantic Avenue Railroad, Brooklyn, Bath and West End Railroad, Coney Island and Gravesend Railway, and South Brooklyn Railway), acquired in November 1898 and leased to the BHRR in April 1899
 Brooklyn Elevated Railroad, acquired in March 1899 and leased to the BHRR in April 1899
 Brooklyn and Brighton Beach Railroad (Brighton Beach Line), acquired in March 1899
 Kings County Elevated Railroad (Fulton Street Line), acquired in November 1899 and merged into the Brooklyn Union Elevated on May 24, 1900
 Prospect Park and Coney Island Railroad (Culver Line), leased to the BHRR on June 18, 1899

The BRT became bankrupt by 1918. The New York Consolidated Railroad and New York Municipal Railway were merged in June 1923, the same month that the BRT was reorganized as the Brooklyn–Manhattan Transit Corporation, to form the New York Rapid Transit Corporation.

Contracts

Original IRT contracts

A contract, later known as Contract 1, was executed on February 21, 1900, between the commission and the Rapid Transit Construction Company, organized by John B. McDonald and funded by August Belmont, for the construction of the subway and a 50-year operating lease from the opening of the line. The project was divided into fifteen sections on which subcontractors submitted construction bids.   

Ground was broken in a ceremony at City Hall on March 24, celebrated at the time as "Tunnel Day". A plan for an extension from City Hall to the Long Island Rail Road's Flatbush Avenue terminal station (now known as Atlantic Terminal) in Brooklyn was adopted on January 24, 1901, and Contract 2, giving a lease of 35 years, was executed between the commission and the Rapid Transit Construction Company on September 11, with construction beginning at State Street in Manhattan on November 8, 1902. Belmont incorporated the IRT in April 1902 as the operating company for both contracts; the IRT leased the Manhattan Railway Company, operator of the four elevated railway lines in Manhattan and the Bronx, on April 1, 1903. Operation of the subway began on October 27, 1904, with the opening of all stations from City Hall to 145th Street on the West Side Branch.

Service was extended to 157th Street on November 12, 1904. The West Side Branch was extended northward to a temporary terminus of 221st Street and Broadway on March 12, 1906. This extension was served by shuttle trains operating between 157th Street and 221st Street. The original system as included in Contract 1 was completed on January 14, 1907, when trains started running across the Harlem Ship Canal on the Broadway Bridge to 225th Street, meaning that 221st Street could be closed. Once the line was extended to 225th Street, the structure of the 221st Street was dismantled and was moved to 230th Street for a new temporary terminus. Service was extended to the temporary terminus at 230th Street on January 27, 1907. An extension of Contract 1 north to 242nd Street at Van Cortlandt Park was approved in 1906 and opened on August 1, 1908. 

The original plan had been to turn east on 230th Street to just west of Bailey Avenue, at the New York Central Railroad's Kings Bridge station. When the line was extended to 242nd Street, the temporary platforms at 230th Street were dismantled, and were rumored to be brought to 242 Street to serve as the station's side platforms. There were two stations on the line that opened later; 191st Street and 207th Street. 191st Street was not open until January 14, 1911, because the elevators and other work had not yet been completed. 207th Street was completed in 1906, but since it was located in a sparsely occupied area, the station was opened in 1907.

The initial segment of the IRT White Plains Road Line opened on November 26, 1904, between East 180th Street and Jackson Avenue. Initially, trains on the line were served by elevated trains from the IRT Second Avenue Line and the IRT Third Avenue Line, with a connection running from the Third Avenue local tracks at Third Avenue and 149th Street to Westchester Avenue and Eagle Avenue. Once the connection to the IRT Lenox Avenue Line opened on July 10, 1905, trains from the newly opened IRT subway ran via the line. Elevated service via this connection was resumed on October 1, 1907, when Second Avenue locals were extended to Freeman Street during rush hours.

The line was then extended to Fulton Street on January 16, 1905, to Wall Street on June 12, 1905, and to Bowling Green and South Ferry on July 10, 1905. In order to complete Contract 2, the subway had to be extended under the East River to reach Brooklyn. The tunnel was named the Joralemon Street Tunnel, which was the first underwater subway tunnel connecting Manhattan and Brooklyn, and it opened on January 9, 1908, extending the subway from Bowling Green to Borough Hall. On May 1, 1908, the construction of Contract 2 was completed when the line was extended from Borough Hall to Atlantic Avenue near the Flatbush Avenue LIRR station. When the IRT extension to Brooklyn opened, riders on the BRT's elevated and trolley lines over the Brooklyn Bridge began using the new subway.

Electrification

The subway system began during the war of the currents when Thomas Edison and his opponent, George Westinghouse, struggled over acceptance of direct current or alternating current as the standard way to deliver electricity. Alternating current became the standard for non-railroad purposes, but New York City Subway adopted direct current as more suitable for urban railroad purposes. The companies built their own power stations to generate their DC. To this day, the New York City Transit Authority converts alternating current to 600 V DC third rail to power the trains, as do most transit railways around the world. (The A Division uses 625 V DC third rail.)

Triborough plan

After the statutory debt ceiling for the now-united city of New York had been raised, there were more plans for subway construction until 1908. The Triborough plan comprised three new lines:
 An IRT line from South Ferry–Whitehall Street in Manhattan, with the IRT Lexington Avenue Line to Pelham Bay Park and Woodlawn in the Bronx
 The BRT Nassau Street Loop, later the BMT Nassau Street Line. The BRT's track went over the Brooklyn, Manhattan, and Williamsburg Bridges; the Nassau Street Line was to connect to the Brooklyn Bridge, but never did. The connections to the other two bridges were built, but with the 1967 opening of the Chrystie Street Connection, the Manhattan Bridge connection was eliminated.
 A BRT subway under Fourth Avenue in Brooklyn, leading to Bay Ridge and Coney Island. This corresponded to today's Fourth Avenue and Sea Beach lines.

The BRT lines were built to wider profiles because the BRT did not want to use IRT trackage, which was narrower by comparison and carried far fewer passengers per hour.  The design was inspired by the cars built for the Cambridge subway (MBTA Red Line) which were designed after studies were conducted on the design and operation of a subway car that could carry the most passengers the most efficiently. The rolling stock, however, had to be the same track gauge so the trains could interoperate under the Dual Contracts. The Fourth Avenue and Sea Beach lines were opened on June 19, 1915, after years of delays for building of these lines and the Nassau Street Line. The first BRT section, however, had opened on September 16, 1908, from Essex Street across the Williamsburg Bridge, but using narrow-width cars.

Until the completion of the Fourth Avenue Line, there was a tram across the Manhattan Bridge which did not connect to any tracks in the New York City Subway. The track was called "Manhattan Bridge Three Cent Line" because the fare was three cents. Along with the Brooklyn and North River Railroad, the two streetcar companies began operations on those tracks. When trackage was connected to the bridge in 1915, the trolleys were moved to the upper level roadways until 1929, when service was discontinued.

Dual Contracts

The BRT, which just barely entered Manhattan via the Brooklyn Bridge, wanted the opportunity to compete with the IRT, and the IRT wanted to extend its Brooklyn line to compete with the BRT. This led to the city's agreement to contract for future subways with both the BRT and IRT.

The expansion of rapid transit was greatly facilitated by the signing of the Dual Contracts on March 19, 1913. Contract 3 was signed between the IRT and the city; the contract between the BRT and the city was Contract 4. The majority of the present-day subway system was either built or improved under these contracts. The Astoria Line and Flushing Line were built at this time and were for some time operated by both companies. Under the terms of Contracts 3 and 4, the city would build new subway and elevated lines, rehabilitate and expand certain existing elevated lines, and lease them to the private companies for operation. The cost would be borne more-or-less equally by the city and the companies. The city's contribution was in cash raised by bond offerings, while the companies' contributions were variously by supplying cash, facilities, and equipment to run the lines.

As part of the contracts, the two companies were to share lines in Queens: a short line to Astoria called the Astoria Line; and a longer line reaching initially to Corona, and eventually to Flushing, called the Corona Line. The lines operated jointly and began from Queensboro Plaza. The IRT accessed the station both from the 1907 Steinway Tunnel and an extension of the Second Avenue Elevated from Manhattan over the Queensboro Bridge. The BRT fed the Queens lines from a new tunnel from the 60th Street Tunnel to Manhattan. Technically the line was under IRT ownership, but the BRT/BMT was granted trackage rights in perpetuity, essentially making it theirs also. 

Both lines were built to IRT specifications. This meant that IRT passengers had a one-seat ride to Manhattan destinations, whereas BRT passengers had to make a change at Queensborough Plaza. This came to be important when service was extended for the 1939 World's Fair, as the IRT was able to offer direct express trains from Manhattan, and the BRT was not. This practice lasted well into the municipal ownership of the lines and was not ended until 1949.

Several provisions were imposed on the companies: the fare was limited to five cents, and this led to financial troubles for the two companies after post-World War I inflation; the city had the right to "recapture" any of the lines it built and run them as its own; and the city was to share in the profits. This eventually led to their downfall and consolidation into city ownership in 1940.

As part of the Dual Contracts, the operations of the original IRT system changed drastically. Instead of having trains go via Broadway, turn onto 42nd Street, and finally turn onto Park Avenue, there were two trunk lines connected by the 42nd Street Shuttle. The system was changed from a "Z" system to an "H" system. The first trunk line, the Lexington Avenue Line assumed the portion of the original IRT system south of Grand Central. The line was extended northward with a new station at Grand Central and turned onto Lexington Avenue, where the line remained as four tracks. The line had connections to the new IRT Pelham Line and IRT Jerome Avenue Line in the Bronx, in addition to a new connection to the IRT White Plains Road Line.

The second trunk, the Broadway–Seventh Avenue Line assumed the portion of the original IRT system north of Times Square, and it extended southward with a new station at Times Square, running down Seventh Avenue, Varick Street and West Broadway. It was predicted that the subway extension would lead to the growth of the Lower West Side, and to neighborhoods such as Chelsea and Greenwich Village. South of Chambers Street, two branches were constructed. The first branch ran to the Battery via Greenwich Street, while the second branch turned eastward under Park Place and Beeckman Street and down William Street, running under the East River through a tunnel before running under Clark Street and Fulton Street until it reached a junction at Borough Hall with the existing Contract 2 IRT Brooklyn Line.

On June 3, 1917, the first portion of the Broadway–Seventh Avenue Line south of Times Square–42nd Street, a shuttle to 34th Street–Penn Station, opened; a separate shuttle service, running between 42nd and 34th Streets, was created. This short extension was opened even though the rest of the route was not yet completed in order to handle the mass of traffic to and from Pennsylvania Station. Only the northern part of the station was opened at this time, and piles of plaster, rails, and debris could be seen on the rest of the platforms. This shuttle was extended south to South Ferry, with a shorter shuttle on the Brooklyn branch between Chambers Street and Wall Street, on July 1, 1918. 

The new portion of the Lexington Avenue Line from Grand Central to 125th Street opened on July 17, 1918. Until the evening of August 1, 1918, it ran as a shuttle on the local tracks only, terminating at 42nd Street and at 167th Street on the IRT Jerome Avenue Line (where the connection from the elevated IRT Ninth Avenue Line merged). The new "H" system was implemented on August 1, 1918, joining the two halves of the Broadway–Seventh Avenue Line, and the two halves of the Lexington Avenue Line. 

An immediate result of the switch was the need to transfer using the 42nd Street Shuttle. The completion of the "H" system doubled the capacity of the IRT system. The local tracks ran to South Ferry, while the express tracks used the Brooklyn Branch to Wall Street, extended into Brooklyn to Atlantic Avenue via the Clark Street Tunnel on April 15, 1919.

The Dual Contracts resulted in the expansion of New York City; people moved to the newly built homes along the newly built subway lines. These homes were affordable, about the same cost as the houses in Brooklyn and Manhattan. The Dual Contracts were the key to dispersion of the city's congested areas. They helped alleviate densely populated areas and probably helped save lives as people were no longer living in heavily diseased areas. The population in Manhattan below 59th Street decreased between the years of 1910 and 1920. People were allowed to move to better parts at the same cost and could have a better and more comfortable life in the suburbs.

Independent System

Mayor John F. Hylan was a strong advocate of public operation of the subway. He was fired from the BRT after working as a motorman for some time, and he wanted to avoid having to spend more money to recapture the IRT and BRT, so he tried to push the two operators out of business. To that end, Hylan had denied allocating money for the BRT by refusing to build new lines, refusing to raise fares (thereby putting the BRT in more debt), denied building permits so that some major building work lasted longer than planned, and even refused to build a new subway yard for the BRT. The Malbone Street Wreck in 1918 contributed to the losses incurred by the two companies, which led to the bankruptcy of the BRT in 1918. The BRT, however, was reorganized into the BMT. The IRT was almost bankrupt, but managed to complete the line to Flushing by 1928. Subsequently, Hylan drew up plans for a third subway network that would be city-built and -operated, in contrast to the existing subway lines, which were privately operated.

On the other hand, New York City had grown to over five and a half million inhabitants and urgently needed new subway lines. The dual system could not keep pace with this ever-increasing ridership. So, a compromise solution was finally found that would allow Hylan's plans as well as the interests of private operators to be considered. However, the city's and Hylan's long-term goal was the unification and consolidation of the existing subway, with the city operating a unified subway system. The city, bolstered by political claims that the private companies were reaping profits at taxpayer expense, determined that it would build, equip and operate a new system itself, with private investment and without sharing the profits with private entities.  This led to the building of the Independent City-Owned Subway (ICOS), sometimes called the Independent Subway System (ISS), the Independent City-Owned Rapid Transit Railroad, or simply The Eighth Avenue Subway after the location of its premier Manhattan mainline. After the city acquired the BMT and IRT in 1940, the Independent lines were dubbed the IND to follow the three-letter initialisms of the other systems.

The original IND system, consisting of the Eighth Avenue mainline and the Sixth Avenue, Concourse, Culver, and Queens Boulevard branch lines, was entirely underground in the four boroughs that it served, with the exception of the Smith–Ninth Streets and Fourth Avenue stations on the Culver Viaduct over the Gowanus Canal in Gowanus, Brooklyn.

Lines
As the first line neared completion, New York City offered it for private operation as a formality, knowing that no operator would meet its terms. Thus the city declared that it would operate it itself, formalizing a foregone conclusion. The first line opened without a formal ceremony. The trains began operating their regular schedules ahead of time, and all stations of the Eighth Avenue Line, from 207th Street in Inwood to Hudson Terminal (now World Trade Center), opened simultaneously at one minute after midnight on September 10, 1932.

On January 1, 1936, a second trunk line—the Sixth Avenue Line—opened from West Fourth Street (where it splits from the Eighth Avenue Line) to East Broadway. The new subway line's construction required the suspension of streetcars on the avenue. The city, wanting to save money by not having to underpin the IRT Sixth Avenue Line before the elevated line was closed, bought the line for $12.5 million and terminated operations on December 5, 1938. To help compensate for the loss in service, service on the Ninth Avenue Elevated was increased.

An extension east to Union Turnpike opened on December 31, 1936. The line was extended to Hillside Avenue and 178th Street, with a terminal station at 169th Street on April 24, 1937. That day, express service began on the Queens Boulevard Line during rush hours, with E trains running express west of 71st–Continental Avenues, and GG trains taking over the local during rush hours. The initial headway for express service was between three and five minutes. 23rd Street–Ely Avenue station opened as an in-fill station on August 28, 1939. Upon its extension into Jamaica, the line drew Manhattan-bound passengers away from the nearby BMT Jamaica Line subway and the Long Island Rail Road.

On July 1, 1937, a third trunk line, the Crosstown Line, opened from Nassau Avenue to Bergen Street. Two years later, on December 15, 1940, local service was begun along the entire IND Sixth Avenue line, including its core part through Midtown Manhattan.

Meanwhile, on the East Side, the need for the IND Second Avenue Line had been evident since 1919, when the New York Public Service Commission launched a study at the behest of engineer Daniel L. Turner to determine what improvements were needed in the city's public transport system. The Great Depression resulted in soaring costs, and the expansion became unmanageable, so it was not built along with the other three IND trunk lines. Construction on the first phase of the IND was already behind schedule, and the city and state were no longer able to provide funding. A scaled-down proposal including a turnoff at 34th Street and a connection crosstown was postponed in 1931. 

Further revision of the plan and more studies followed. By 1939, construction had been postponed indefinitely, and Second Avenue was relegated to "proposed" status. The 1939 plan for subway expansion took the line not only into the Bronx (by now as a single line to Throggs Neck) but also south into Brooklyn, connecting to the stub of the IND Fulton Street Line at Court Street. Construction of the line resumed in 1972 but was ended during the 1975 fiscal crisis, and work was again restarted in 2007.

Expansion plans

Since the opening of the original New York City Subway line in 1904, various official and planning agencies have proposed numerous extensions to the subway system. One of the better known proposals was the "Second System," which was part of a plan by the Independent Subway to construct new subway lines in addition and take over existing subway lines and railroad right-of-ways. Though most of the routes proposed over the decades have never seen construction, discussion remains strong to develop some of these lines, to alleviate existing subway capacity constraints and overcrowding, the most notable being the Second Avenue Subway. Plans for new lines date back to the early 1910s.

On August 28, 1922, Mayor John Francis Hylan announced that his new system would comprise  of currently operating routes and another 100 miles of new routes, to be completed by December 31, 1925, and in competition with the IRT and BMT.

In 1926, a loop subway service was planned to be built to New Jersey.

The most grandiose plan, conceived in 1929, was to be part of the city-operated IND. By 1939, with unification planned, all three systems were included. As this grandiose expansion was not built, the subway system is only 70% of what it was planned to be. Magnificently engineered, almost entirely underground, with  platforms and flying junctions throughout, the IND system tripled the city's rapid transit debt, ironically contributing to the demise of plans for an ambitious expansion proposed before the first line of the first system was even opened.

Because of this debt, after the IND Sixth Avenue Line was completed, only 28 new stations were built. Five stations were on the abandoned NYW&B-operated IRT Dyre Avenue Line, fourteen stations were on the abandoned LIRR Rockaway Beach Branch (now the IND Rockaway Line), six were on the Archer Avenue Lines and 63rd Street Lines (built as part of a 1968 plan), two stations (57th Street and Grand Street) were part of the Chrystie Street Connection, and the Harlem–148th Street terminal. Four MTA Capital Construction-funded stations (the 34th Street station on the 7 Subway Extension and the three stations on the Second Avenue Subway) have been constructed with up to 14 more planned. However, the four MTA Capital Construction stations cost , reflecting the scale of the debt that the IND brought the city into.

Unification

In June 1940, the IND's operator the New York City Board of Transportation took over the transportation assets of the IRT and BMT. In June 1953, the New York City Transit Authority, a state agency incorporated for the benefit of the city, now known to the public as MTA New York City Transit, succeeded the BoT. A combination of factors had this takeover coincide with the end of the major rapid transit building eras in New York City. The city immediately began to eliminate what it considered redundancy in the system, closing several elevated lines including the IRT Ninth Avenue Line and most of the IRT Second Avenue Line in Manhattan, and the BMT Fifth and Third Avenue Lines and most of the BMT Fulton Street Line in Brooklyn.

Division differences
Despite the unification, a distinction between the three systems survives in the service labels: IRT lines (now referred to as A Division) have numbers and BMT/IND (now collectively B Division) lines use letters. Because the A Division lines are of lower capacity for a given capital investment, all new extensions and lines built between World War II and 2007 have been for the B Division. A Division cars can travel on B Division lines when necessary but are not used for passenger service on those lines because of the dangerously wide gap between the car and the station platform. This stems from the IRT and BRT's long-standing disagreement where the BRT intentionally built cars that were too wide for the IRT.

The original IRT subway lines (those built before the Dual Contracts) were built to modified elevated line dimensions. The clearances and curves on these lines are too narrow and too sharp for any IND or BMT equipment. The later extensions of the IRT, constituting the bulk of the IRT system, were built to wider dimensions, and so are of a profile that could support the use of IND/BMT sized equipment.

B Division equipment could operate on much of A Division if station platforms were trimmed and trackside equipment moved, thus letting A Division service carry more passengers. However, there is virtually no chance of this happening because the older, narrower portions of A Division are centrally situated, such that it would be impossible to put together coherent through services. The most that can be reasonably hoped for is that some branch lines of Division A might be resized and attached to B Division lines. This was done with the BMT Astoria Line in Queens which had formerly been dual-operated with normal IRT trains and special narrow BMT shuttles.

Post-unification expansion and reorganization
New York hoped that the profits from the remaining formerly privately operated routes would support the expensive and deficit-ridden IND lines and simultaneously be able to repay the systems' debts, without having to increase the original fare of five cents. But during World War II, which gave a reprieve to the closure of most rail transit in the U.S., some closures continued, including the remainder of the IRT Second Avenue Line in Manhattan (1942) and the surviving BMT elevated services over the Brooklyn Bridge (1944). The Second World War also caused renewed inflation, which finally caused a fare increase to ten cents in 1947 and six years later to 15 cents.

Ridership skyrocketted during the late 1940s, and on December 23, 1946, the system-wide record of 8,872,249 fares was set.

Because the consolidation dragged in the first years after unification, some improvements in operational processes were rather slow, and soon the question of organization was raised. The outsourcing of subway operations to the Port Authority of New York and New Jersey was favored at one point. On June 15, 1953, the NYCTA was founded with the aim of ensuring a cost-covering and efficient operation in the subways.

There was a need to overhaul rolling stock and infrastructure of the once-private routes, especially for the IRT, where nearly all of the infrastructure was aged. The oldest cars came there from the time the subway opened in 1904, and the oldest subway cars of BMT in 1953 dated from the system's first years, in 1913. Therefore, a total of 2,860 cars for the A Division were delivered between 1948 and 1965, which constituted the replacement of almost the entire prewar IRT fleet. On the B Division, 2,760 cars were ordered. Platforms were doubled in length systemwide. At some stations, gap fillers were installed because the station extensions were curved. Also in this period, the BMT replaced their signals. The Main Line R36 cars were the first equipment to be equipped with two-way radio as delivered standard equipment in 1965, with the first use of radio in the subway system on the IRT Lexington Avenue Line in May 1965. The first successful air conditioned train (R38) was placed into service in July 1967.

In 1946, Mayor William O'Dwyer initiated a program to lengthen station platforms to accommodate ten-car trains. The first contract, which was completed in August 1946, extended the platforms at 125th Street, 207th Street, 215th Street, 225th Street, 231st Street and 238th Street on the IRT Broadway–Seventh Avenue Line for $423,000. Additional platform extensions were completed on the Broadway–Seventh Avenue Line in October 1946. On this date the platform extensions at 103rd Street, 110th Street, 116th Street, 137th Street, 145th Street, 157th Street, 168th Street, 181st Street, 191st Street and Dyckman Street were completed. This project cost $3.891 million. The platform extensions at the Hoyt Street station on the IRT Eastern Parkway Line opened in November 1946, being completed for $733,200. Stations along the IRT Lexington Avenue Line were next to receive the improvements.

In January 1947, the 23rd Street, 28th Street and 33rd Street platform extensions were completed, costing $4.003 million. Work was subsequently completed at the Bleecker Street and Spring Street stations for $1.97 million. The $1.992 million contract to lengthen the platforms at the Canal Street and Worth Street stations to the south was completed in April 1947. In September 1947, a contract extending the platforms for stations in the Bronx was completed. The first stage of the plan was completed in June 1949, lengthening the platforms at Prospect Avenue, Jackson Avenue, Intervale Avenue, Simpson Street, Freeman Avenue, 174th Street and 177th Street on the IRT White Plains Road Line for $315,000. In September 1949, the Chairman of the Board of Transportation, William Reid, announced that the program to lengthen 32 IRT stations had been completed for $13.327 million. Reid also announced that the Board had created a five-year plan to lengthen all remaining BMT and IRT stations to accommodate ten-car trains.

Only two new lines were opened in this era, the IRT Dyre Avenue Line in 1941 and the IND Rockaway Line in 1956, with an extension of the latter to Far Rockaway–Mott Avenue in 1958. Both of these lines were rehabilitations of existing railroad rights-of-way rather than new construction. The former line was the City portion of the New York, Westchester and Boston Railway, an electrified commuter line closed in 1937, and the latter a line obtained from the Long Island Rail Road. While the latter is a long and substantial line, it consists mostly of a long right-of-way crossing Jamaica Bay with a single station on Broad Channel island and two branches on a peninsula that is only several city blocks wide. For a time, the IND Rockaway Line was considered its own subway division.

The 169th Street station on the IND Queens Boulevard Line provided an unsatisfactory terminal setup for a four track line, and this required the turning of F trains at Parsons Boulevard, and no storage facilities were provided at the station. Therefore, the line was going to be extended to 184th Place with a station at 179th Street with two island platforms, sufficient entrances and exits, and storage for four 10-car trains. The facilities would allow for the operation of express and local service to the station. Construction on the extension started in 1946 with planned completion in 1949. The extension was completed later than expected and opened on December 11, 1950. This extension was delayed due to the Great Depression and World War II. Both E and F trains were extended to the new station.

Decline

The originally planned IND system was built to the completion of its original plans after World War II ended, but the system then entered an era of deferred maintenance in which infrastructure was allowed to deteriorate. In 1951 a half-billion dollar bond issue was passed to build the Second Avenue Subway, but money from this issue was used for other priorities and the building of short connector lines, namely a ramp extending the IND Culver Line over the ex-BMT Culver Line at Ditmas and McDonald Avenues in Brooklyn (1954), allowing IND subway service to operate to Coney Island for the first time, the 60th Street Tunnel Connection (1955), linking the BMT Broadway Line to the IND Queens Boulevard Line, and the Chrystie Street Connection (1967), linking the BMT line via the Manhattan Bridge to the IND Sixth Avenue Line.

By January 1955, the Port Authority of New York and New Jersey and the Triborough Bridge and Tunnel Authority could theoretically raise $1.25 billion effective immediately. In his 1974 book The Power Broker, Robert A. Caro estimated that this amount of money could modernize both the Long Island Rail Road for $700 million and the Hudson & Manhattan Railroad for $500 million, with money left over to build the Second Avenue Subway as well as proposed extensions of subway lines in Queens and Brooklyn. However, Robert Moses, the city's chief urban planner at the time, did not allow funding for most mass transit expansions in the New York City area, instead building highways and parkways without any provisions for mass transit lines in the future. Caro noted that the lack of attention to mass transit expansions and routine maintenance contributed to the decline of the subway: "When Robert Moses came to power in New York in 1934, the city's mass transportation system was probably the best in the world. When he left power in 1968 it was quite possibly the worst."

Soon after, the city entered a fiscal crisis. Closures of elevated lines continued. These closures included the entire IRT Third Avenue Line in Manhattan (1955) and the Bronx (1973), as well as the BMT Lexington Avenue Line (1950), much of the remainder of the BMT Fulton Street Line (1956), the downtown Brooklyn part of the BMT Myrtle Avenue Line (1969), and the BMT Culver Shuttle (1975), all in Brooklyn, and the BMT Jamaica Line in Queens starting in 1977. The BMT Archer Avenue Line was supposed to replace the BMT Jamaica Line's eastern end, but it was never completed to its full extent, and opened in 1988 as a stub-end line, terminating at Jamaica Center.

Construction and maintenance of existing lines was deferred, and graffiti and crime were very common. Trains frequently broke down, were poorly maintained, and were often late, while ridership declined by the millions each year. As in all of the city, crime was rampant in the subway in the 1970s. Thefts, robberies, shootings and killings became more frequent. The rolling stock was very often painted with graffiti or vandalized both inside and outside. As the New York City Police Department was completely overwhelmed, the public reacted with unease, and the subway was deliberately avoided. Around 1980, the reliability of the vehicles was a tenth of their reliability in the 1960s, and 40 percent of the network required speed restrictions. Because there had been no further studies of the subway since 1975, one third of the fleet was out of use during rush hours due to serious technical defects. In addition, signs were fitted incorrectly, and spare parts were missing or were bought in too large quantities, could not be found, or could not be installed due to lack of repairmen.

The New York City Subway tried to keep its budget balanced between spending and revenue, so deferred maintenance became more common, which drew a slow but steady decline of the system and rolling stock. Furthermore, the workers were consolidated into the Transport Workers Union in 1968. A pension was set up, and workers were allowed to retire after 20 years of service without any transitional period. About a third of the most highly experienced staff immediately retired, resulting in a large shortage of skilled workers.

Rehabilitation started in the 1980s as part of a $18 billion financing program. Between 1985 and 1991 over 3,000 subway cars were overhauled and fitted with air conditioning to increase comfort, reliability and durability while deferring car purchases The TA only replaced the oldest cars each division, so it bought only 1,350 new vehicles. Increased patrols and fences around the train yards offered better protection against graffiti and vandalism. At the same time, the TA began an extensive renovation of the routes. Within ten years the tracks were thereby renewed almost systemwide. The Williamsburg Bridge and the Manhattan Bridge, which had strong corrosion damage, were refurbished over the years.

The renovation of the stations was initially limited to security measures, fresh paint, new lighting and signs, but the TA also tried to improve the service that had been neglected. This ranged from new uniforms and training for the staff to correct destination signs on the rolling stock. Some subway services were also adapted to the changing needs of customers. Another stated goal was to reduce crime or at least an improvement in the subjective sense of security. At night, the railway police and members of the citizens' initiative Guardian Angels, formed in 1979, patrolled in the subway trains. In the 1990s, the crime in the city and its subway declined significantly.

Late 1950s and early 1960s 
In 1956, the NYCTA chairman, Charles Patterson, proposed removing the seats from the trains on the 42nd Street Shuttle to increase the passenger load.

On May 1, 1957, a standard maximum interval of 20 minutes between trains was put into place during late nights, with the exception of the Rockaway lines where it was 24 minutes. Some lines had service run as infrequently as 30 minutes. Also on this date, BMT express service was extended to 57th Street from 42nd Street. Earlier in 1957, local service on the BMT Jamaica Line was extended to Crescent Street from Eastern Parkway, and rush hour service was increased to run every 5 minutes.

Under a $100 million rebuilding program, increased and lengthened service was implemented during peak hours on the 1 train. Switching at a junction north of 96th Street, delayed service as trains from the Lenox Avenue Line which ran local switched from the express to the local, while trains from the Broadway Branch that ran express switched from the local to the express. This bottleneck was removed on February 6, 1959. All Broadway trains were locals, and all Lenox Avenue trains were expresses, eliminating the need to switch tracks. All 3 trains began to run express south of 96th Street on that date running to Brooklyn. 1 trains began to run between 242nd Street and South Ferry all times. Trains began to be branded as Hi-Speed Locals, being as fast as the old express service was with 8-car trains consisting of new R21s and R22s on the line.

On November 15, 1962, the express platforms at Lexington Avenue–59th Street opened to reduce transfer congestion at Grand Central–42nd Street, and to allow transfers between the express trains and BMT trains to Queens. Even before the express platforms were added, this station was the busiest on the line. Construction on the express station had begun on August 10, 1959.

Program for Action

In the mid-1960s,  was made available to the Metropolitan Transportation Authority (MTA) of New York City for a large subway expansion proposed by then-Mayor John Lindsay. About $1.23 billion was spent to create three tunnels and a half-dozen holes as part of construction on the Second Avenue and 63rd Street Lines. Construction for the lines stopped in 1975 because the city almost went bankrupt, yet none of the lines were done when federal payments were suspended in 1985. The two-phase Program for Action was funded as follows:
 Phase I was to cost $1.6 billion and be completed over the span of a decade.
 Phase II came after Phase I and cost $1.3 billion. Phase II was composed of mostly extensions of existing lines and Phase I-built lines.

The Program for Action also called for supplanting elevated structures with new subways. The eastern end of the BMT Jamaica Line was to be replaced with the BMT Archer Avenue Line, while the IRT Third Avenue Line was to be demolished to make way for a subway route parallel to the Metro-North tracks at Park Avenue.

Deferred maintenance
Because the early subway systems competed with each other, they tended to cover the same areas of the city, leading to much overlapping service. The amount of service has actually decreased since the 1940s as many elevated railways were torn down, and finding funding for underground replacements has proven difficult. The subway's decline began in the 1960s and continued through the late 1980s.

Graffiti

In 1973, the city's graffiti epidemic surged so that nearly every subway car was tagged with graffiti. It was worsened by the budgetary restraints on New York City, which limited its ability to remove graffiti and perform transit maintenance. Mayor John Lindsay declared the first war on graffiti in 1972, but it would be a while before the city was able and willing to dedicate enough resources to that problem to start impacting the growing subculture. The MTA tried rubbing the graffiti off with an acid solution, but maintaining the cars to keep them relatively graffiti-free was costing them around $1.3 million annually. In the winter of 1973, the car-washing program was stopped. Attempts to wash cars with an acid solution in September 1974 were detrimental to the fleets' upkeep.

As graffiti became associated with crime, many demanded that the government take a more serious stance toward it, particularly after the popularization of the Fixing Broken Windows philosophy in 1982. By the 1980s, increased police surveillance and implementation of increased security measures (razor wire, guard dogs) combined with continuous efforts to clean it up led to the weakening of the New York's graffiti subculture.

An extensive car-washing program in the late 1980s ensured the elimination of graffiti throughout the system's rolling stock. In 1984 the NYCTA began a five-year program to eradicate graffiti. The years between 1985 and 1989 became known as the "die hard" era. A last shot for the graffiti artists of this time was in the form of subway cars destined for the scrap yard. With the increased security, the previous elaborate "burners" on the outside of cars were now marred with simplistic marker tags which often soaked through the paint. By mid-1986 the NYCTA were winning their "war on graffiti". On May 10, 1989, the rolling stock was made 100% graffiti-free, with the washing of the last train in the subway system that still had graffiti. As the population of artists lowered so did the violence associated with graffiti crews and "bombing".

Ridership and service cuts
Ridership in 1975 had decreased to a point last seen in 1918, with ridership decreasing by 25 million per year. The MTA reduced the length of trains during off-peak periods, and canceled work on several projects being built as part of the Program for Action, including the Second Avenue Subway and an LIRR line through the 63rd Street Tunnel to a Metropolitan Transportation Center in East Midtown, Manhattan. Ridership kept dropping rapidly, having decreased by 25 million passengers between June 30, 1976, and June 30, 1977; in the previous eight years, 327 million passengers had stopped using the subway. The proportion of the fleet that was in service during the morning peak period was reduced, and train headways were increased: on four local services, trains were reduced from once every four minutes to once every five minutes.

On May 27, 1975, the NYCTA announced that in September of that year 94 daily IRT trips would be discontinued, accounting for 4 percent of then-existing service on the IRT. The trips were to be discontinued to cut operating deficits. Express service on the 7 was to be discontinued between the hours of 9:30 a.m. and 3:30 p.m. and was to be replaced by more frequent local service. During the same month, the NYCTA was considering making the A train a local at all times except rush hours, when it would remain an express.

On December 17, 1975, the MTA announced that a 4.4 percent cutback of rush hour train service would take place on January 18, 1976. The cutbacks, the third of the year, trimmed 279 train runs from the previous 6,900. Service was most drastically reduced on the Lexington Avenue Line, with seven fewer southbound express trains during the morning rush hours. The cuts were the first of a three-phase program that was put in effect between January and July 1976. The cuts permitted a savings of $12.6 million a year for the NYCTA, which had an increasing deficit. Other subway services were changed or discontinued as part of the plan. On January 19, F trains were planned to stop running express in Brooklyn, and the GG was to be cut back to Smith–Ninth Streets.

In April 1975 it was planned that all rush hour 1 trains would begin running to 242nd Street; these runs had previously terminated at 137th Street. During midday hours, trains on the 1 were to be shortened to five cars. In July, it was planned that the EE would be discontinued; N trains were to have been extended to Continental Avenue via the Queens Boulevard Line to replace it. Manhattan-bound N trains were to continue running express, while in the opposite direction they would run local. N trains would alternate between terminating at Whitehall Street or Coney Island during rush hours. CC trains, in July, were planned to be extended from Hudson Terminal to Rockaway Park replacing the E, which was to have been cut back to Hudson Terminal. The K was planned to be discontinued in July.

The changes that were supposed to take place in July instead took effect on August 30. 215 more runs were eliminated on that date. In 1967 there were 8,200 daily trips, and on August 30, 1976, there were 6,337 daily trips.

On December 14, 1976, the NYCTA proposed another package of service cuts. The cuts, planned to take effect in January 1977, would have eliminated service on the Bowling Green–South Ferry Shuttle, the Franklin Avenue Shuttle, and AA service, which would be replaced by the A during late nights. GG service would be truncated to Queens Plaza during late evenings and late nights. B and N service would have been cut back to shuttles, running between 36th Street and Coney Island on their respective lines. It was also proposed that during off-peak hours 10-car trains would be cut to eight, six or four car trains.

Infrastructure

The subway had been gradually neglected since the 1940s, and its situation had been exacerbated by the low fare. On May 20, 1970, two people died at the Jackson Heights–Roosevelt Avenue station in the worst subway collision since the 1928 Times Square derailment. Following the 1970 accident, New York Magazine highlighted the subway system's condition in a lengthy expose. About 85.8% of trains were on schedule in 1970, with 1,142 equipment-related delays in April 1970. However, issues such as broken lights, fans, and signs; defective doors, wheels, and brakes; and subway cars that often became uncoupled or "pulled apart", were still prevalent. One out of three IRT stations did not have running water in case of emergency. In addition, the system's staff were leaving in massive numbers, with 5,655 workers having retired or quit from early 1969 to mid-1970.

The system also had many slow-speed areas because of obstacles that could cause derailments, and every subway car had graffiti; fleet availability during rush hours declined from 5,557 in 1976 to 5,025 in 1977, and to 4,900 in May 1978. Mean Distance Between Failures (MDBF) rates were at all time lows, as the MDBF rate system-wide was 6,000 miles by 1980. In 1979, 200 retired R16 cars were reactivated because the newest rolling stock in the system, the R46, had cracked trucks, and were only allowed to operate during rush hours while they were sent for rehabilitation.

At the height of the transit crisis in 1983, on-time performance dropped below 50%. Hundreds of trains never made it to their destination and in 1981, 325 train runs were abandoned on a typical day. Additionally, cars caught fire 2,500 times every year.

In December 1978 a New York Daily News article highlighted the worst parts of the subway. The Grand Central–42nd Street station was the worst underground station and the Middle Village–Metropolitan Avenue station was the worst elevated station. The subway cars in the worst condition were the R10s. The subway line with the worst signals was the IRT Broadway–Seventh Avenue Line, so the signals were upgraded in the 1980s. The BMT Sea Beach Line had the worst track; its infrastructure had not been upgraded since its opening in 1915. Despite $800 million being allocated by the state in 1978, the TA had spent less than half of the $600 million allocated in 1967. The agency made some infrastructure improvements, though because they were not cosmetic improvements, the public still assumed that the subway had high crime, even during periods of decreased crime.

Due to deferred maintenance, the condition of the subway system reached dangerous conditions in the early 1980s, and the TA considered abandoning the Archer Avenue and 63rd Street projects. Structural defects were found in elevated structures systemwide and on the Manhattan and Williamsburg Bridges, causing frequent closures or delays on many subway lines during the 1980s. Reroutes from both bridges were necessitated; while the Manhattan Bridge, between 1986 and 2004, had two of its four tracks closed at a time for construction, the Williamsburg Bridge needed a shutdown from April to June 1988 for emergency structural repairs to be made. Federal funding for the repair of the BMT Jamaica Line was deferred throughout the 1980s due to the extremely bad state of the Williamsburg Bridge. Pigeon droppings corroded the bridge's steel, there were over 200 broken suspender cables, and concrete in the bridge began to come off and leave large holes.

Due to low ridership and the increasing shabbiness of the subway, parts or most of several lines—the BMT Canarsie Line; the IND Crosstown Line; the IRT Jerome Avenue Line or IND Concourse Line north of 161st Street–Yankee Stadium; and the BMT Jamaica Line east of either Broadway Junction or Cypress Hills—were proposed for closure and abandonment in 1981. Other lines proposed for closure included the remaining part of the IND Culver Line, the BMT West End Line, the IRT Dyre Avenue Line, part of the IND Rockaway Line, part of the IRT White Plains Road Line, and the remaining part of the BMT Myrtle Avenue Line. The BMT Jamaica Line was demolished, mainly as part of the Program for Action, but also due to low ridership. Officials also proposed shutting the subway at night between midnight and 6 a.m. in order to reduce crime. Off-peak train trips, as well as trips on the branches outside the city's core, were reduced sharply.

Operations in 1981 had deteriorated so that:
 One day in January saw  of the fleet out of service, and the first two weeks had 500 canceled trips per day
 A 10-minute trip in 1910 took 40 minutes in 1981.
 The previous year, there had been 30 derailments.
 The A Division's fleet of 2,637 cars had never been renovated, and MDBF rates were a quarter of that in 1970.
 The newest fleet, the R44s and R46s, made up  of the B Division's fleet of 4,178 cars, and constantly broke down.
 Furthermore, a sample of 50 cars in 1980 showed that half had serious maintenance problems, such as a flammable undercoat of metal film, flattened wheels, burned out lights, and defective/missing emergency switches.

In 1986, the MTA and Regional Plan Association again considered closing  of above-ground lines to follow population shifts. They included the Jerome Avenue, Dyre Avenue, Franklin Avenue, Crosstown, and Rockaway lines, as well as parts of the Myrtle and Jamaica lines. The south end of the Culver Line and the north ends of the IRT Broadway–Seventh Avenue and White Plains Road Lines were also proposed for closure, as was all of the BMT Sea Beach Line.

Crime

In the 1960s, mayor Robert Wagner ordered an increase in the Transit Police force from 1,219 to 3,100 officers. During the hours at which crimes most frequently occurred (between 8:00 p.m. and 4:00 a.m.), the officers went on patrol in all stations and trains. In response, crime rates decreased, as extensively reported by the press. Due to another crime increase in the subway, the rear cars of subway consists were shut at night beginning in July 1974.

However, during the subway's main era of decline following the city's 1976 fiscal crisis, there were daily reports of crime. Two hundred were arrested for possible subway crimes in the first two weeks of December 1977 under an operation dubbed "Subway Sweep". Violence on the subway increased drastically in the last week of 1978, and six murders occurred in the first two months of 1979, compared to nine during the entire previous year. The IRT Lexington Avenue Line was known to frequent muggers, so in February 1979, Curtis Sliwa's Guardian Angels group began patrolling the  train during the night. By February 1980, there were 220 Guardian Angels across the system.

To attract passengers, in September 1978 the TA introduced the “Train to the Plane”, a premium-fare service that provided limited stops along Sixth Avenue in Manhattan from 57th Street to Howard Beach, where passengers could transfer to a shuttle bus to JFK Airport. The service was staffed by a transit police officer, and the additional fare was paid on board. This was discontinued in 1990 due to low ridership and the high cost of its operation.

The increase of crime in the subway led to the firing of Transit Police Chief Sanford Garelik. There were about 250 felonies (equivalent to 13,000 per year) occurring in the system every week by September 1979; some police officers had to stop patrolling quality of life crimes and look only for violent crimes. Among other problems included:

While daily felonies were nearly halved between 1979 and 1980, decreasing from 261 to 154, overall crime increased by 70% in the same period. A series of window-smashing incidents on subway cars started in 1980 on the IRT Pelham Line and spread throughout the rest of the system, causing delays when damaged trains needed to be taken out of service. Over a thousand pieces of damaged windows were replaced between January 27 and February 2, 1985. Other actions included increasing the 60-cent fare to 65 cents to pay the salaries of additional transit police; putting a subway-crimes court in the Times Square station; and stationing a police officer in each car during night hours.

Richard Ravitch, chairman of the MTA, said that even he was scared of going on the subway. Despite the MTA discussing methods to increase ridership, the 1982 figures fell to levels last seen in 1917. Within less than ten years, the MTA had lost around 300 million passengers, mainly because of fears of crime. In July 1985, the Citizens Crime Commission of New York City published a study showing this trend, fearing the frequent robberies and generally bad circumstances. As a result, the Fixing Broken Windows policy, which proposed to stop large-profile crimes by prosecuting quality of life crimes, was implemented. Along this line of thinking, the MTA began a five-year program to eradicate graffiti from subway trains in 1984, and hired one of the original theorists of Broken Windows policing, George L. Kelling, as a consultant for the program in 1985.

In the early afternoon of December 22, 1984, Bernhard Goetz shot four young African American men from the Bronx on a New York City Subway train. The incident got nationwide media coverage. That day, the men—Barry Allen, Troy Canty, Darrell Cabey (all 19), and James Ramseur (18)—boarded a downtown  train (Broadway – Seventh Avenue Line express) carrying screwdrivers, apparently on a mission to steal money from video arcade machines in Manhattan. When the train arrived at the 14th Street station in Manhattan, 15 to 20 other passengers remained with them in R22 subway car 7657, the seventh car of the ten-car train. 

At the 14th Street station, Goetz entered the car through the rearmost door, crossed the aisle, and took a seat on the long bench across from the door. After Canty asked Goetz how he was, Goetz replied affirmatively, at which point the four boys supposedly moved over to the left of Goetz, blocking Goetz off from the other passengers in the car. They then asked Goetz for money. He fired five shots, seriously wounding all four men. Nine days later he surrendered to police and was eventually charged with attempted murder, assault, reckless endangerment, and several firearms offenses. A jury found him not guilty of all charges except for one count of carrying an unlicensed firearm, for which he served eight months of a one-year sentence. 

The incident sparked a nationwide debate on race and crime in major cities, the legal limits of self-defense, and the extent to which the citizenry could rely on the police to secure their safety. Although Goetz, dubbed the "Subway Vigilante" by New York City's press, came to symbolize New Yorkers' frustrations with the high crime rates of the 1980s, he was both praised and vilified in the media and public opinion. The incident has also been cited as a contributing factor to the groundswell movement against urban crime and disorder, and the successful campaigns by the National Rifle Association of America to loosen restrictions on the concealed carrying of firearms.

In 1989, the Metropolitan Transportation Authority asked the transit police (then located within the NYCTA) to focus on minor offenses such as fare evasion. In the early nineties, the NYCTA adopted similar policing methods for Penn Station and Grand Central Terminal. In 1993, crime rates in the subway dropped, part of a larger decrease across the city.

On April 2, 1995, the New York City Police Department and the Transit Police Department merged.

Effects of the Program for Action

Ironically, the Program for Action forced the closure of a large number of subway lines. The Bronx remnant of the IRT Third Avenue Line closed in 1973, to be provisionally replaced by a new subway under the Metro-North Railroad tracks on Park Avenue, one block to the west. The single-tracked Culver Shuttle between Ditmas Avenue and Ninth Avenue, once a three-tracked line, closed on May 11, 1975. On August 27, 1976, the  service was truncated from Church Avenue to Smith–Ninth Streets, while service was discontinued on the K and EE routes. On December 15, 1976, GG service at the other terminal was shortened to Queens Plaza. The BMT Jamaica Line was truncated from 168th Street  to 121st Street between September 11, 1977, and the early 1980s, replaced by the BMT Archer Avenue Line in 1988.

Debris falling from and on the tracks
Existing elevated structures posed a large danger; the New York Post published a story that featured debris that had fallen from the BMT Astoria Line. Debris from the IRT Pelham Line nearly killed a passerby, and debris from the BMT West End Line led to a lawsuit against the MTA. Concrete falling on the BMT Brighton Line near the Beverley Road station caused a months-long service disruption between November 1976 and February 1977.

Fare evasion

Fare evasion seemed a small problem compared to the graffiti and crime; however, fare evasion was causing the NYCTA to lose revenue. NYCTA's strategy for restoring riders' confidence took a two-pronged approach. In 1981, MTA's first capital program started system's physical restoration to a State-of-Good-Repair. Improving TA's image in riders' minds is as important as overcoming deferred maintenance. Prompt removal of graffiti  and prevention of blatant fare evasion would become central pillars of the strategy to assure customers that the subway is “fast, clean, and safe”:

Similarly, fare evasion was taken seriously. The NYCTA began formally measuring evasion in November 1988. When TA's Fare Abuse Task Force (FATF) was convened in January 1989, evasion was 3.9%. After a 15-cent fare increase to $1.15 in August 1990, a record 231,937 people per day, or 6.9%, didn't pay. The pandemonium continued through 1991. To combat the mounting problem, FATF designated 305 “target stations” with most evaders for intensive enforcement and monitoring. Teams of uniformed and undercover police officers randomly conducted “mini-sweeps”, swarming and arresting groups of evaders. Special “mobile booking centers” in converted city buses allowed fast-track offender processing. Fare abuse agents covered turnstiles in shifts and issued citations. Plainclothes surveyors collected data for five hours per week at target locations, predominantly during morning peak hours. In 1992, evasion began to show a steady and remarkable decline, dropping to about 2.7% in 1994.

The dramatic decrease in evasion during this period coincided with a reinvigorated Transit Police, a 25% expansion of City police, and a general drop in crime in U.S. cities. In the city, crime rate decline begun in 1991 under Mayor David Dinkins and continued through next two decades under Mayors Rudolph Giuliani and Michael Bloomberg. Some observers credited the “broken windows” approach of law enforcement  where minor crimes like evasion are routinely prosecuted, and statistical crimefighting tools, whereas others have indicated different reasons for crime reduction. Regardless of causality, evasion checks resulted in many arrests for outstanding warrants or weapons charges, likely contributing somewhat to public safety improvements. Arrests weren't the only way to combat evasions, and by the early 1990s NYCTA was examining methods to improve fare control passenger throughputs, reduce fare collection costs, and maintain control over evasions and general grime. The AFC system was being designed, and evasion-preventing capability was a key consideration.

TA's queuing studies concluded that purchasing tokens from clerks was not efficient. Preventing 'slug' use required sophisticated measures like tokens with metal alloy centers and electronic token verification devices. To provide better access control, the NYCTA experimented with floor-to-ceiling gates and “high wheel” turnstiles. Prototypes installed at 110th Street/Lexington Avenue station during a “target hardening” trial reduced evasions compared to nearby “control” stations. However, controls consisting entirely of “high-wheels” created draconian, prison-like environments, with detrimental effects on station aesthetics. Compromises with more secure low-turnstile designs were difficult, as AFC did not prevent fare evasion.

Production Automated Fare Collection (AFC) implementation began in 1994. New turnstiles, including unstaffed high wheels, and floor-to-ceiling service gates, featured lessons learned from trials. As AFC equipment was rolled out, evasion plummeted. Fare abuse agents, together with independent monitoring, were eliminated.

Rehabilitation and rising trend

Ridership increased 4% between 1978 and 1979, mainly because of the improving economy. Numerous improvements were touted in a 1979 Daily News report, including air conditioning and closed-circuit television. As part of the Urban Mass Transit Act, $1.7 billion would be provided by the state and the Port Authority. Aesthetics chairperson Phyllis Cerf Wagner announced a program called "Operation Facelift", which entailed aesthetic improvements such as repainting and relighting the platforms, quicker replacement processes for windows and doors, and expanding the number of seats on platforms.

During the mid-1980s, reconstruction began. Stations were refurbished and rolling stock was repaired and replaced. "Neighborhood maps" for wayfinding were added in subway stations starting in 1985. Maintenance of the subway began to improve: while 21 trains derailed while in passenger service during 1983, there were 15 such incidents in 1984 and three in 1985. "Red tag" areas, where trains reduced speed to 10 mph due to dangerous maintenance conditions, were almost entirely eliminated by 1986. The 325 R62 cars had a MDBF rate of 50,000 miles, more than five times higher than the other fleet, with the newly overhauled World's Fair R36 equipment on the Flushing Line averaging over 30,000 miles in 1986–87. The MDBF of many rolling stock increased from 6,000 miles in 1980 to 10,000 miles in September 1986, and hundreds cars were overhauled or cleaned of graffiti. Speedometers were also installed on existing and new rolling stock.

On January 1, 1982, the MTA implemented the first of its five-year Capital Improvement programs to repair the existing system. Scheduled Maintenance Services were formed to proactively replace components, and the MTA conducted general overhauls of the R26 through R46 fleets. Older equipment (any car classes with contract numbers below R32s on the B Division and R26s on the A Division) were retrofitted with air conditioning. The red tag areas were incrementally repaired and replaced with welded rail. At the end of the century, the MDBF rates for the entire system were at record highs and steadily increasing. The Franklin Avenue Shuttle, however, was worse in 1989 than it was in 1980, and necessitated a complete renovation by 1998, because the MTA planned to abandon the line by the end of the century.

Projects during this time

Starting in the early 1970s, there were plans for improving the subway system.
In 1976, the MTA proposed abandoning the Franklin Avenue Shuttle to save money, but dropped the plan due to community pushback. The possibility of the discontinuation was revisited again in 1998, but again, fierce community opposition to it forced the MTA to rehabilitate the line.

In 1977, the Linden Shops opened in Brooklyn, enabling the MTA to build track panels indoors throughout the year, among other objects.

On January 16, 1978, the MTA opened three transfer stations:
 Between the 14th Street station on the IRT Broadway–Seventh Avenue Line and the previously-connected stations on the BMT Canarsie Line and IND Sixth Avenue Line
 Between the IRT Lexington Avenue Line at Canal Street and the local platforms of the BMT Broadway Line
 Between the BMT Brighton Line, the BMT Fourth Avenue Line, and the IRT Eastern Parkway Line at Atlantic Avenue–Barclays Center

In April 1981, the following projects were considered by the MTA:
 Adding a  service via the BMT West End Line, running between the Financial District and Bay Parkway
 Extending  trains to 168th Street and eliminating  service
 Adding a K service via the Chrystie Street Connection from Canarsie to midtown Manhattan 
 Adding a non-stop express from 59th Street and the World Trade Center, which was ultimately untenable because of capacity constraints

In 1981, the MTA began installing welded rails on a few underground portions of the system.

In June 1983, the following projects were considered by the MTA:
 The JFK Express would be extended to Rockaway Park–Beach 116th Street, and the $5 fare and the special guard would be eliminated, making it like any other subway line. Trains would be 8 cars long instead of 4 cars long, and the headway between trains would be 18 minutes, instead of 20 minutes.
 During rush hours, the CC would terminate at Euclid Avenue, instead of serving the Rockaways.
 B train service would run all day from Coney Island to 168th Street, instead of terminating at 57th Street during non-peak hours.
 AA service, which operated during non-rush hours, would be eliminated.
 A new shuttle service, named H, would run between 57th Street and World Trade Center.

On March 25, 1986, the Regional Plan Association (RPA) proposed several changes. A major part of the plan was eliminating parts of the system and expanding the system to reflect population shifts. The plan called for eliminating 26 miles of elevated lines and building 17 miles of new subway lines, and 20 miles of new surface lines. The RPA also suggested buying new subway cars; implementing One Person Train Operation outside of rush hours; giving reduced fares to city residents using the Long Island Rail Road or Metro-North Railroad to travel to Midtown Manhattan; adding premium-fee express services; closing 10% of stations;  and doubling off-peak services. The RPA also suggested:
 Extending the IND 63rd Street Line to southeast Queens
 Building the Second Avenue Subway
 Restoring the Rockaway Beach Branch
 Building a subway line under Jewel Avenue in Queens, to branch off the IND Queens Boulevard Line
 Building a tunnel under the Hudson River to extend the IRT Flushing Line to New Jersey
 Complete the LIRR tunnel to Midtown
 Provide the East Side Access to Grand Central Terminal via the lower level of the 63rd Street Line at a cost of $1.4 billion (to be completed in the early 2020s)
 Purchase 500 new subway cars at a cost of $500 million.

In April 1986, the New York City Transit Authority began to study the possibility of eliminating sections of 11 subway lines because of low ridership. The segments are primarily located in low-income neighborhoods of the Bronx, Brooklyn and Queens, with a total of 79 stations, and 45 miles of track, for a total of 6.5 percent of the system. The lines were first identified in the first part of a three-year project, the Strategic Plan Initiative, which started in April 1985, by the MTA to evaluate the region's bus, subway, and commuter rail systems. The eleven segments all had low ridership, needed expensive rebuilding, and duplicated service on parallel lines. The lines being studied included the following lines:
 The IRT Broadway–Seventh Avenue Line from 215th Street to 242nd Street, which was duplicated by buses.
 The IRT White Plains Road Line from East 180th Street to 241st Street, which was duplicated by buses.
 The entire IRT Dyre Avenue Line, which was duplicated by buses.
 The IRT Jerome Avenue Line from 167th Street to Woodlawn, which was paralleled by the IND Concourse Line.
 The entire IND Rockaway Line south of Howard Beach, due to low ridership.
 The IND Culver Line south of Avenue U, due to low ridership and duplication by buses.
 The entire IND Crosstown Line, due to low ridership and duplication by buses.
 The BMT Jamaica Line between Crescent Street and 121st Street, due to low ridership and duplication by buses.
 The entire BMT Myrtle Avenue Line, which was duplicated by buses.
 The entire BMT Sea Beach Line, which ran close to the BMT West End Line.
 The entire BMT Franklin Avenue Line, due to major deterioration.

By August 1989, the MTA was considering these projects:
 Connecting the IND 63rd Street Line to the IND Queens Boulevard Line
 Adding signals to the Queens Boulevard Line's express tracks so that trains could operate in both directions, and adding 250 subway cars
 Completing the Second Avenue Subway
 A  connection from Parkside Avenue on the BMT Brighton Line to Seventh Avenue on the IND Culver Line, due to the Manhattan Bridge subway closures
 700 subway cars for the IRT
 Three storage yards, two in Brooklyn and one in Queens
 Expanding the terminal tracks at Flatbush Avenue–Brooklyn College station
 Building a 10-car platform for South Ferry station (IRT Broadway–Seventh Avenue Line)
 Building transfer stations:
 The Broadway – Lafayette Street station to the northbound IRT Lexington Avenue Line at Bleecker Street (done in September 2012)
 A connection between the South Ferry, Bowling Green and Whitehall Street stations (done between South Ferry and Whitehall Street in March 2009)
 Botanic Garden on the Franklin Avenue Shuttle with the Franklin Avenue station on the IRT Eastern Parkway Line (done in 1999)
 Closing the Hewes Street and Lorimer Street stations on the BMT Jamaica Line, and building a new intermediate station that connected with Broadway on the IND Crosstown Line.

In December 1988, three transfers were opened between existing stations, and three brand-new stations were opened. They were:
 Lexington Avenue / 53rd Street and 51st Street stations
 Long Island City – Court Square and 23rd Street – Ely Avenue stations (now known as Court Square and Court Square – 23rd Street, respectively)
 42nd Street – Port Authority Bus Terminal and Times Square – 42nd Street stations
The new stations were Sutphin Boulevard – Archer Avenue – JFK Airport, Jamaica Center – Parsons/Archer, and Jamaica – Van Wyck. Other service changes were implemented that day. Skip-stop service on the J/Z trains was also started on December 11, 1988. Additionally, IND Fulton Street Line express service was extended from weekdays only to all times except late nights.

New subway cars were also purchased: the R62 and R62A fleets for the A Division and the R68 and R68A fleets for the B Division. The R62 in particular was the first New York City Subway car class built by a foreign manufacturer. These were all delivered between 1983 and 1989. The R10, R14, R16, R17, R21, and R22 car classes all were retired with the deliveries of the R62/As and R68/As. On May 10, 1989, the last train with graffiti was taken out of service; the subway has been mostly graffiti-free since this point.

On October 29, 1989, the IND 63rd Street Line was opened. It was nicknamed the "tunnel to nowhere" due to its stub end at 21st Street–Queensbridge, and also due to the fact that the three-station extension lay dormant for over a decade after completion. The 3.2 mile line included three new stations and cost a total of $868 million. The line was viewed as an enormous waste of money.

Revitalization and recent history

1990s 
Subway ridership increased through the 1990s. Throughout David Dinkins's mayoralty from 1989 to 1993, the city went from being in debt to having a $200 million surplus, which was achieved by raising taxes. However, Dinkins's tax plans were unpopular, and he lost the 1993 election to Rudy Giuliani. Giuliani wanted to demonstrate that he could successfully run New York City without raising taxes, so he eliminated $400 million from the MTA's capital budget in 1994. He did not suggest any transit improvements, however. State lawmakers also reduced MTA funding in the 1990s, which remained mostly unchanged through the 2000s.

In 1998, a large portion of the New York City Subway system was nominated for addition to the National Register of Historic Places. The nomination encompassed 48 stations, 11 electrical substations, six signal towers, four station head houses, three buildings in storage yards, and one tunnel. The MTA supported the listing, which would increase the agency's chances of receiving more federal funding.

September 11, 2001 

The September 11 attacks resulted in service disruptions on lines running through Lower Manhattan. Tracks and stations under the World Trade Center were shut down within minutes of the first plane crash. All remaining New York City Subway service was suspended from 10:20am to 12:48pm. Immediately after the attacks and more so after the collapses of the Twin Towers, many trains running in Lower Manhattan lost power and had to be evacuated through the tunnels. Some trains had power, but the signals did not, requiring special operating procedures to ensure safety.

The IRT Broadway–Seventh Avenue Line, which ran below the World Trade Center between Chambers Street and Rector Street was the most destroyed. Sections of the tunnel as well as Cortlandt Street were badly damaged and had to be rebuilt. Service was immediately suspended south of Chambers Street and then cut back to 14th Street. There was also subsequent flooding on the line south of 34th Street–Penn Station. After the flood was cleaned up, express service was able to resume on September 17 with  trains running between Van Cortlandt Park–242nd Street and 14th Street, making local stops north of and express stops south of 96th Street, while  and  trains made all stops in Manhattan (but bypassed all stations between Canal Street and Fulton Street until October 1). 1/9 skip-stop service was suspended.

After a few switching delays at 96th Street, service was changed on September 19. The  train resumed local service in Manhattan, but was extended to New Lots Avenue in Brooklyn (switching onto the express tracks at Chambers Street) to replace the 3, which now terminated at 14th Street as an express. The  train continued to make local stops in Manhattan and service between Chambers Street and South Ferry as well as skip-stop service remained suspended. Normal service on all four trains was restored September 15, 2002. The Cortlandt Street station needed extensive reconstruction, and after a total rebuild costing $158 million, it reopened on September 8, 2018.

Service on the BMT Broadway Line was also disrupted because the tracks from the Montague Street Tunnel run adjacent to the World Trade Center and there were concerns that train movements could cause unsafe settling of the debris pile. Cortlandt Street station, which sits under Church Street, sustained significant damage in the collapse of the towers. It was closed until September 15, 2002, for removal of debris, structural repairs, and restoration of the track beds, which had suffered flood damage in the aftermath of the collapse. 

All service on the BMT Broadway Line ran local north of Canal Street except for the Q, which ran normally from 57th Street to Brighton Beach via Broadway and Brighton Express. J/Z skip-stop service was suspended at this time. Normal service on all seven trains resumed on October 28.

The only subway line running between Midtown and Lower Manhattan was the IRT Lexington Avenue Line, which was overcrowded before the attacks and at crush density until the BMT Broadway Line reopened. Wall Street was closed until September 21.

The IND Eighth Avenue Line, which has a stub terminal serving the  train under Five World Trade Center was not damaged, but covered in soot. The  train, which ran normally from 145th Street or Bedford Park Boulevard to 34th Street–Herald Square via Central Park West Local, also replaced C trains on weekdays). Service was cut back to Canal Street when C service resumed on September 21, but Chambers Street and Broadway–Nassau Street remained closed until October 1. World Trade Center remained closed until January 2002.

Later 2000s

Ridership increases

Generally, ridership kept rising as the subway system improved in its maintenance, cleanliness, frequency, and on-time ratio; ridership started to increase as graffiti and crime rates dropped heavily after 1989. From 1995 to 2005, ridership on city buses and subways grew by 36%, compared with a population gain in the city of 7%. With dramatic increases in fuel prices in 2008, as well as increased tourism and residential growth, ridership on buses and subways grew 3.1% up to about 2.37 billion trips a year compared to 2007. This is the highest ridership since 1965.

By 2013, ridership had reached 1.7 billion riders per year (despite closures related to Hurricane Sandy), a level not seen since 1949. In April 2013, New York magazine reported that the system was more crowded than it had been in the previous 66 years. The subway reached a daily ridership of 6 million for 29 days in 2014, and was expected to record a similar ridership level for 55 days in 2015; by comparison, in 2013, daily ridership never reached 6 million.

Expansions 
Several expansions started construction or were opened during the mayoralty of Michael Bloomberg from 2001 to 2013. The IND 63rd Street Line's connection to the IND Queens Boulevard Line was first, opened on December 16, 2001. To serve the new connection, the F train was rerouted via the 63rd Street Line, and to replace the F along 53rd Street, a new V train was created–running between Forest Hills–71st Avenue and Second Avenue via the Queens Boulevard and Sixth Avenue local tracks. The G, to allow for room to operate the V, was cut back to Court Square. Two out-of-system transfers were put into place; the first was to allow F passengers to continue to have a free transfer to the Lexington Avenue Line, which was lost when the line was rerouted–the transfer connects the Lexington Avenue/59th Street station and the Lexington Avenue–63rd Street stations. The second one connected the Court Square station with the 45th Road–Court House Square station.

In 2003, money was allocated for the construction of a new station at South Ferry, and in 2005, construction commenced on the new station. Initially, the station's construction had been opposed because of the high cost and low perceived time savings. The South Ferry loop station only accommodates the first five cars of a train, so that the rear five cars of a 10-car 1 train cannot load or unload. Because of the curve at the station gap fillers are required, and as a result the new station was built as a two-track, full (10-car)-length island platform on a less severe curve, permitting the operation of a typical terminal station. The MTA claimed that the new station saved four to six minutes of a passenger's trip time and increased the peak capacity of the 1 service to 24 trains per hour, as opposed to 16 to 17 trains per hour with the loop station.

In the late 1990s and early 2000s, talk began to circulate about taking up the construction of the Second Avenue Subway. Most New Yorkers regarded these plans with cynicism, since citizens were promised the line since well before the Third Avenue elevated was torn down in 1955. Funds have been set aside and environmental impact reports have been completed. A tunnelling contract was awarded to the consortium of Schiavone/Shea/Skanska (S3) by the MTA on March 20, 2007. This followed preliminary engineering and a final tunnel design completed by a joint venture between AECOM and Arup. A ceremonial groundbreaking for the subway was held on April 12, 2007, and contractor work to prepare the project's initial construction site at 96th Street and Second Avenue began on April 23, 2007.

In October 2007, the 7 Subway Extension construction contract was awarded, extending the IRT Flushing Line to 34th Street. Groundbreaking began in June 2008 and the tunnels were completed by 2010. The project, which was the first one funded by the city in over 60 years, was intended to aid redevelopment of Hell's Kitchen around the West Side Yard of the Long Island Rail Road.

Budget cuts
The MTA faced a budget deficit of US$1.2 billion in 2009. Several other routes were modified as a result of the deficit. The  was truncated to Court Square full-time. Construction headways on eleven routes were lengthened, and off-peak service on seven routes were lengthened.

2010s and 2020s

Hurricane Sandy damage

On October 28, 2012, a full closure of the subway was ordered the day before the arrival of Hurricane Sandy. All services on the subway, the Long Island Rail Road and Metro-North were gradually shut down that evening. The storm caused serious damage to the system, especially the IND Rockaway Line, which had many sections between Howard Beach–JFK Airport and Hammels Wye on the Rockaway Peninsula heavily damaged, leaving it essentially isolated from the rest of the system. The H ran between Beach 90th Street and Far Rockaway–Mott Avenue, where passengers could transfer to a free shuttle bus. The line reopened on May 30, 2013, with a new retaining wall along the line to prevent against future storm surges.

Several of the system's tunnels under the East River were flooded by the storm surge. The South Ferry station suffered serious water damage, and on April 4, 2013, the older loop-configured station reopened to provide temporary service. The first tunnel to be repaired, the Greenpoint Tube under Newtown Creek, was fixed during a series of weekend closures in 2013 and a full closure during summer 2014. The second tunnel, the Montague Street Tunnel, was closed completely from August 2013 to September 2014.

Hurricane Sandy also damaged the Clark Street Tubes, necessitating a full closure on weekends between June 2017 and June 2018, thus affecting 2, 3, 4, and 5 service. The new South Ferry station reopened on June 27, 2017, in time to accommodate the Clark Street closures. A week after South Ferry reopened, the MTA closed the BMT Myrtle Avenue Line for ten months to rebuild two of the line's viaducts, the  approaches to the line's junction with the BMT Jamaica Line and Fresh Pond Bridge over the Montauk Branch in Queens. This was in preparation for a reconstruction of the BMT Canarsie Line tunnels under the East River.

The MTA also planned to completely close the BMT Canarsie Line west of Bedford Avenue for 18 months between early 2019 and mid-2020. In April 2017, the shutdown was shortened to 15 months. The closure was changed to a night and weekend shutdown in January 2019.

Other rehabilitation projects included:
 Covering over 3,200 openings at ground level. , there are 19 contracts in progress and 11 contracts pending. In addition, a preventive measure, 68 subway entrances in Lower Manhattan are also receiving fabric plugs that are intended to keep flood water out. In 2017,  waterproof doors and curtains were installed in 24 Lower Manhattan locations at a cost of $30,000 each.
 Adding flood mitigation measures, like barriers, to the Coney Island, 207th Street, and Lenox subway yards
 Adding flood mitigation measures to the IND Rockaway Line
 Rebuilding other tubes. , the Steinway, 53rd Street, Cranberry, and Joralemon tunnels had been repaired, in addition to the Crosstown, Montague Street, and Clark Street tunnels. The Rutgers Street Tunnel was pending repairs.

Expansions open
Originally budgeted at $400 million, the new South Ferry station opened in 2009 at a total of $530 million, with most of the money being a grant from the Federal Transit Administration earmarked for World Trade Center reconstruction. In January 2009, the opening was delayed because the tracks were too far from the edge of the platform. Other delays were attributed to leaks in the station. The problem was corrected and the station opened on March 16, 2009. With the opening of the new station, a transfer was available to the Whitehall Street station with a new connecting passageway.

On December 20, 2013, Mayor Michael Bloomberg took a ceremonial ride on a train to the new 34th Street terminal of the IRT Flushing Line, celebrating a part of his legacy as Mayor, during a press tour of the uncompleted station. The project was 90% complete in 2013, and was expected to open in 2014, but did not open until September 13, 2015. According to The New York Times, the delay in the extension's opening was due to the installation of custom-made incline elevators that kept malfunctioning. A December 2014 New York Post article also attributed the delay to Hudson Yards' developer, The Related Companies', need to dig caissons for the foundations, just above the subway station; the foundation work needed to be complete before the MTA could proceed with opening the station.

The Fulton Center building opened to the public on November 10, 2014, completing a decade-long refurbishment of the Fulton Street station in lower Manhattan. It was controversially funded as part of the post-9/11 rebuilding project.

As part of the Second Avenue Subway's opening, W service, which had not run since 2010, was restored on November 7, 2016. On January 1, 2017, the Second Avenue Subway was opened, with stations crowded with passengers seeking to check out the new line. About 48,200 passengers entered the new stations on that day, excluding passengers who toured the line by entering at a station in the rest of the system.

2017 state of emergency 

Underlying the fanfare of expansions, however, there was a gradual decline in maintenance of the subway, and consequently, fewer trains started arriving to their destinations on time. Maintenance spending declined before rising again from the 1990s to 2012, but on-time performance slowly eroded during that same time period. By 2017, only 65% of weekday trains reached their destinations on time, the lowest rate since the transit crisis of the 1970s. In the summer of that year, the subway system was officially put in a state of emergency after a series of derailments, track fires, and overcrowding incidents.

To solve the system's problems, the MTA officially announced the Genius Transit Challenge on June 28, 2017, where contestants could submit ideas to improve signals, communications infrastructure, or rolling stock. On July 25, 2017, Chairman Joe Lhota announced a two-phase, $9 billion New York City Subway Action Plan to stabilize the subway system and to prevent the continuing decline of the system. The first phase, costing $836 million, consisted of five categories of improvements in Signal and Track Maintenance, Car Reliability, System Safety and Cleanliness, Customer Communication, and Critical Management Group. The $8 billion second phase would implement the winning proposals from the Genius Transit Challenge and fix more widespread problems. Six winning submissions for the Genius Transit Challenge were announced in March 2018.

In October 2017, city comptroller Scott Stringer released an analysis of the effect of subway delays on the economy and on commuters. The study found that based on a normal wait time of 5 minutes and an average wage of $34 per hour in 2016, "worst-case" subway delays of more than 20 minutes could cost up to $389 million annually in lost productivity. By comparison, "mid-case" delays of between 10 and 20 minutes could cost $243.1 million per year, and "best-case" delays of between 5 and 10 minutes could cost $170.2 million per year.

In November 2017, The New York Times published its investigation into the crisis. It found that the crisis had arisen as a result of financially unsound decisions by local and state politicians from both the Democratic and Republican parties. By this time, the subway's 65% average on-time performance was the lowest among all major cities' transit systems, and every non-shuttle subway route's on-time performance had declined in the previous ten years.

Several improvements were made in response to the transit crisis. In the short term, signals, trains, and tracks were improved under the "Fast Forward" program. Further, the MTA's 2020-2024 capital plan called for adding elevators and ramps to 66 subway stations and adding modern signaling systems to parts of six more physical lines, to be funded by congestion pricing in Manhattan. Additionally, several other changes were proposed to improve service. For instance, in February 2019, several politicians wrote a letter to the MTA, asking the agency to consider splitting the R train in half to increase reliability. In January 2020, Stringer sent a letter to NYCTA president Andy Byford stated that the "abundance" of shuttered entry points along subway routes was contributing to severe overcrowding and longer commute times, and requested that the MTA develop and publicize plans for restoring closed entry points. The state of emergency ended on June 30, 2021, after previously being renewed 49 times.

Planning 
There are several lines being planned. This includes a subway line under Utica Avenue in Brooklyn; an outer-borough circumferential line, the Triboro RX; a reuse of the northern part of the Rockaway Beach Branch; and a line to LaGuardia Airport.

In November 2016, the MTA requested that the Second Avenue Subway's Phase 2 project be entered into the Project Development phase under the Federal Transit Administration's New Starts program. The FTA granted this request in late December 2016. Under the approved plan, the MTA would complete an environmental reevaluation by 2018, receive funding by 2020, and open Phase 2 between 2027 and 2029. Funding for Phase 2 was later included in the 2025-2029 MTA capital plan. The line will eventually comprise four phases, running as far north as 125th Street in East Harlem during Phase 2, and south to Hanover Square in Lower Manhattan in Phases 3 and 4.

COVID-19 pandemic and crime concerns

The spread of the COVID-19 pandemic to the New York City area in March 2020 resulted in mass closures of gathering spaces.  After the MTA recommended that only essential workers use the New York City Subway, ridership started to decrease.  Part-time services were temporarily suspended.  Starting on May 6, 2020, stations were closed overnight for cleaning, in what became the first planned overnight closure in the subway's history.  The overnight closures were to be suspended once the pandemic was over, and bus service was added.  In early May 2021, Governor Cuomo announced that the overnight subway closures would end on May 17, 2021, with 24-hour service resuming on that date.

In February 2021, the New York City Subway removed benches from several stations in an effort to reduce the number of homeless persons sleeping on them, which during the COVID-19 pandemic was considered to be unsanitary. This move drew considerable backlash from riders who alleged that the removal of the benches amounts to disenfranchising disabled people and senior citizens, as well as being unfair to homeless populations.

Although ridership decreased by 40 percent from 2019 to 2022, the number of crimes in the system remained roughly the same, prompting riders to express concerns over increased crime. There had been six murders in the subway in 2020; the following year, the subway recorded eight murders, the highest annual total in 25 years. During the pandemic, the subway system experienced several high-profile incidents, including a January 2022 shoving death of a passenger in Times Square and an April 2022 mass shooting in Brooklyn. , crime in the system had increased 40 percent from the previous year; the number of crimes recorded to date was roughly the same as in 2019, when ridership was much higher. In response, governor Kathy Hochul and mayor Eric Adams announced a plan to increase police presence within the subway system.

Incidents and accidents

Train accidents
Many train accidents have been recorded since 1918, when a train bound for South Ferry smashed into two trains halted near Jackson Avenue on the IRT White Plains Road Line in the Bronx.

Only accidents that caused injuries, deaths, or significant damage are listed.

 October 3, 1918: A collision at Jackson Avenue killed two and injured 18.
 November 1, 1918: The Malbone Street Wreck killed 97 and injured 200.
 August 6, 1927: Two bombs exploded at 28th Street (BMT Broadway Line) and 28th Street (IRT Lexington Avenue Line).
 August 24, 1928: A Derailment in Times Square on a southbound express train on the IRT Broadway–Seventh Avenue Line killed 16 and injured 100.
 August 22, 1938: A collision at the 116th Street station (IRT Lexington Avenue Line) killed 2 and injured 51.    
 September 26, 1957: A motorman and three passengers were killed at an accident at 231st Street.
 November 28, 1962: A crane fell in Coney Island, killing three.
 May 4, 1965: A crane fell on the IRT New Lots Line, killing one.
 December 29, 1969: A southbound train derailed near East 180th Street in the Bronx, injuring 48.
 February 27, 1970: A  train hit a bumper block at the Pelham Bay Park station, injuring 7.
 May 20, 1970: Two Brooklyn-bound  trains crashed west of Roosevelt Avenue, killing 2 and injuring 77.
 July 17, 1970: A Manhattan-bound E train ran into an A train at Hoyt–Schermerhorn Streets, injuring 37.
 August 1, 1970: A fire in the tunnel near Bowling Green killed one and injured 50.
 May 27, 1971: A 7 train was stuck in the Steinway Tunnel and one person died of a heart attack.
 July 16, 1971: A fire took place south of 14th Street on the IRT Lexington Avenue Line, injuring 11.
 August 28, 1973: A 7 train was hit by falling concrete in the Steinway Tunnel, killing one and injuring 18.
 October 4, 1973: Three passengers were injured when a Lexington Avenue Express train derailed 900 feet south of the Bergen Street station.
 October 25, 1973: A fire in two train cars at Longwood Avenue led to a rear-end accident.
 December 1, 1974: Six people were injured as a Franklin Avenue Shuttle train consisting of R32s derailed at the same spot of the Malbone Street Wreck hitting the wall leaving a massive gash in the side of one of the cars.
 April 12, 1977: Two passengers were injured when an  train derailed between the Manhattan Bridge and DeKalb Avenue.
 June 30, 1978: Three people were injured when an L train derailed, with nine of the cars leaving the track, damaging the track and platform.
 December 13, 1978: A  train derailed south of 59th Street Columbus Circle crashing into the tunnel wall, injuring 16 of 100 passengers.
 November 20, 1980: A  train derailed as it entered Chambers Street injuring 16 passengers.
 January 12, 1981: A  train derailed on the BMT Brighton Line near Kings Highway injuring 10 passengers.
 July 3, 1981: A motorman was killed and 135 passengers are injured as a Manhattan bound train plowed into the rear of a second train halted for a failed signal between Sutter Avenue and Utica Avenue.
 April 25, 1986: An out of service  train crashed into the bumper blocks at 179th Street, and the motorman died of a heart attack.
 July 26, 1990: A B train and an M train collided, injuring 36 people.
 December 28, 1990: An electrical fire occurred in the Clark Street tunnel, killing 2 and injuring 188.
 August 28, 1991: In a derailment at Union Square, five people were killed and more than 200 were injured when a southbound  train derailed due to a drunk motorman.
 October 7, 1993: Two  trains collided at the Graham Avenue station; 45 were injured.
 August 15, 1994: A southbound B train derailed near Ninth Avenue in Brooklyn, injuring 11.
 December 21, 1994: A bomb made by Edward Leary detonated in a subway car, injuring him and 47 others.
 February 9, 1995: An  train and a  train collided near the Ninth Avenue station. Seven people on the B train were injured, and the motorman of the M train was culpable.
 June 5, 1995: In a collision on the Williamsburg Bridge, a Manhattan-bound  train crashed into a stopped Manhattan-bound  train after passing a red light at high speed, killing one and injuring 50.
 August 23, 1995: A  train collided with another at Brooklyn Bridge–City Hall station, injuring 87.
 July 3, 1997: A Queens-bound  train derailed in Harlem, near the 135th Street station, injuring 15 people.
 July 14, 1997: The last car of a southbound  train derailed near Franklin Avenue, injuring four people.
 November 20, 1997: A Forest Hills-bound  train rear-ended a  train in a tunnel near the Steinway Street station, injuring 40, none seriously.
 April 12, 2000: A northbound  train derailed near 68th Street, injuring nine people.
 June 21, 2000: A southbound  train derailed just after leaving the DeKalb Avenue station in Brooklyn, injuring more than 80 people. Officials said the third car jumped off the track, pulling the second car along.
 May 2, 2014: A Manhattan-bound  train with 1,000 people on board derailed near 65th Street, injuring at least 19 people.
 September 10, 2015: A southbound  train with approximately 80 people on board derailed near Hoyt–Schermerhorn Streets, injuring at least five people.
 June 27, 2017: A southbound A train derailed then caught fire near 125th Street. The derailment, caused by improperly secured replacement rails, resulted in 39 minor injuries.
 March 27, 2020: A northbound 2 train caught fire in the Central Park North–110th Street station, killing the motorman and injuring at least 16 other people. Since several other fires had been observed in nearby stations, the incident was investigated as a possible arson.
 September 20, 2020: A northbound A train derailed at 14th Street/Eighth Avenue station when a homeless man clamped wooden planks onto the roadbed causing the train to derail. Three passengers were injured.

Additionally, in an accident recorded before 1918, a derailment happened on the Ninth Avenue Elevated in Manhattan on September 11, 1905, resulting in 13 deaths and 48 serious injuries.

Other disasters
Other accidents in the history of the subway do not involve trains; several people have been fatally electrocuted by the subway's third rails, and yet others have been fatally pushed onto the tracks. Fatal pushing incidents include the 2022 death of Michelle Go at the Times Square station.

In 1960, a person nicknamed the Sunday Bomber set off a series of bombs in the New York City Subway during Sundays and holidays, killing one woman and injuring 51 other commuters.  and ferries On April 12, 2022, a mass shooting attack occurred on the N train, injuring at least 29 people.

See also
 History of New York City transportation
 Beach Pneumatic Transit

References

Further reading

 
  Includes numerous construction photos.

External links

 MTA timeline of events
 nycsubway.org: A thorough treatment of the current system and history, including historic and track maps

Articles
 Early Days of the NYC Subway – slideshow by Life magazine
 The New York City Subway: A Century by John Stern
 The Subway Issue – special October 2010 regional news section by The New York Times
 Why New York City Stopped Building Subways, by Jonathan English, April 16, 2018. 
 The Commuting Principle That Shaped Urban History, Jonathan English, August 29, 2019.